Herbert James Bignall (28 January 1906 – 30 October 1989) was a British long-distance runner. He competed in the marathon at the 1928 Summer Olympics. He also competed in the marathon at the 1930 British Empire Games for England and was a carpenter by trade.

References

1906 births
1989 deaths
Athletes (track and field) at the 1928 Summer Olympics
British male long-distance runners
British male marathon runners
Olympic athletes of Great Britain
People from Reigate
Athletes (track and field) at the 1930 British Empire Games
Commonwealth Games competitors for England